This is a list of Academy Award winners and nominees from Switzerland.

Best Actor in a Leading Role

Best Actor in a Supporting Role

Best Documentary

Best Animated Feature

Best Original Screenplay

Best Adapted Screenplay

Best Story

Best Live Action Short

Best Animated Short

Best Costume Design

Best Visual Effects

Best International Feature Film

Honorary Academy Award

References

Lists of Academy Award winners and nominees by nationality or region
Academy Award winners and nominees